Gérard Autajon is a French businessman. He is the chief executive officer of Autajon C.S., a Montélimar-based packaging company founded by his father in 1964. His name appeared in the Panama Papers in April 2016.

References

Living people
People from Montélimar
French chief executives
People named in the Panama Papers
Year of birth missing (living people)